Dol Dol is a shigella in Kenya's Rift Valley Province.

References 

Populated places in Rift Valley Province